Philip Julian Moffatt (February 17, 1908 – May 16, 1987) was an American football player.  He played at the halfback position for the Stanford Cardinal football team. He was selected by the United Press as a first-team player on the 1930 College Football All-America Team.  During World War II, he served in the United States Navy.  Moffatt holds the Stanford records with 10 interceptions in a season and 20 in a career.  He also holds the Stanford career rushing record with an average of 5.9 yards per carry averaged 5.9 yards per carry in his Stanford career, the highest total among running backs in school history.  He has been inducted into Stanford's Hall of Fame.

References 

1908 births
1987 deaths
American football halfbacks
Stanford Cardinal football players
Players of American football from Oklahoma
Sportspeople from Muskogee, Oklahoma